The 2008 All-Ireland Intermediate Hurling Championship was the 25th staging of the All-Ireland Intermediate Hurling Championship since its establishment by the Gaelic Athletic Association in 1961. The championship began on 31 May 2008 and ended on 30 August 2008.

Wexford entered the championship as the defending champions, however, they were beaten by Kilkenny in the Leinster semi-final.

The All-Ireland final was played on 30 August 2008 at Semple Stadium in Thurles, between Kilkenny and Limerick, in what was their first meeting in the final in 10 years. Kilkenny won the match by 1-16 to 0-13 to claim their second championship title overall and a first title since 1973.

Kilkenny's Paddy Hogan was the championship's top scorer with 6-15.

Team summaries

Results

Leinster Intermediate Hurling Championship

Leinster semi-final

Leinster final

Munster Intermediate Hurling Championship

Munster quarter-final

Munster semi-finals

Munster final

All-Ireland Intermediate Hurling Championship

All-Ireland semi-final

All-Ireland final

Championship statistics

Top scorers

Top scorers overall

Top scorers in a single game

References

Intermediate
All-Ireland Intermediate Hurling Championship